Quality Hill or Quality Hill Historic District may refer to:
 Quality Hill Historic District (Denver, Colorado), a Denver Landmark
 Quality Hill, Kansas City, a neighborhood
Quality Hill Historic District (Pawtucket, Rhode Island), listed on the NRHP in Rhode Island
 Quality Hill, Washington, D.C., a historic building in the Georgetown neighborhood of Washington, DC
Quality Hill Historic District (Clarksburg, West Virginia), listed on the NRHP in West Virginia